Melanoplus gracilis, known generally as graceful grasshopper, is a species of spur-throated grasshopper in the family Acrididae. Other common names include the graceful spur-throat grasshopper and graceful narrow-winged locust. It is found in North America.

References

Melanoplinae
Articles created by Qbugbot
Insects described in 1876